Joan Wiffen  (née Pederson, 4 February 1922 – 30 June 2009) was a self-taught New Zealand paleontologist known for discovering the first dinosaur fossils in New Zealand.

Early life
Wiffen was born in 1922 and was brought up in Havelock North and the King Country. She only had a very short secondary school education as her father believed that higher education was wasted on girls, resulting in her education opportunities being limited during her youth. At the age of 16, Wiffen joined the Women's Auxiliary Air Force during World War II where she served for six years.

Career
In 1975 Wiffen discovered the first dinosaur fossils in New Zealand in the Mangahouanga Valley in Northern Hawkes Bay. Her first discovery was the tail bone of a theropod dinosaur. Her later finds included bones from a hypsilophodont, a pterosaur, an ankylosaur, mosasaurs and plesiosaurs. In 1999, Wiffen discovered the vertebra bone of a titanosaur in a tributary of the Te Hoe River. The fossils Wiffen found are primarily held in a GNS Science collection.

Honours and awards
Wiffen was awarded an honorary DSc by Massey University in 1994. In the 1995 New Year Honours, she was appointed a Commander of the Order of the British Empire for services to science. In 2004, she won the Morris Skinner Award from the Society of Vertebrate Paleontology. In 2017, Wiffen was selected as one of the Royal Society Te Apārangi's "150 women in 150 words", celebrating the contributions of women to knowledge in New Zealand.

Personal life
In 1953 she married her husband Pont Wiffen and they had two children. Pont and Joan Wiffen travelled widely in both New Zealand and Australia collecting both minerals and small fossils of sea animals with their children. The couple were very interested in fossils, and Pont ended up taking classes on fossils and such things. One day when Pont was home sick, Joan went to the class in his place and ever since then she was in awe of dinosaurs and fossils. She died at the age of 87 on 30 June 2009 in Hastings Hospital.

Further reading
Valley of the Dragons: The Story of New Zealand's Dinosaur Woman by Joan Wiffen: Random Century, Auckland, 1991

References

External links
"Dinosaur finder", audio of Wiffen speaking about her first visit to Maungahounga. Radio New Zealand Sound Archives Ngā Taonga Kōrero.

1922 births
2009 deaths
Amateur paleontologists
New Zealand military personnel of World War II
New Zealand paleontologists
People from the Hawke's Bay Region
Women paleontologists
New Zealand Commanders of the Order of the British Empire
20th-century women scientists
New Zealand women scientists
New Zealand women in World War II